Élie Kakou (born 12 January 1960 in Nabeul– died 10 June 1999; real name Alain Kakou) was a Tunisian-French actor and stand-up comedian.

He is known for his portrayal of the character Madame Sarfati, a parody of Jewish mothers. He died of lung cancer at the age of 39 in Paris.

Filmography
 La Vérité si je mens! (1997)
  (1998)
 Sex, Sacrifice and Submission (1998)
  (1999)
  (1999)

References

1960 births
1999 deaths
Deaths from lung cancer in France
French male film actors
French humorists
20th-century Tunisian Jews
Jewish French male actors
People from Nabeul
20th-century French male actors
French male writers
20th-century French male writers